Hong is the pinyin romanization of the Chinese surname  (Hóng). It was listed 184th among the Song-era Hundred Family Surnames. Today it is not among the 100 most common surnames in mainland China but it was the 15th-most-common surname in Taiwan in 2005. As counted by a Chinese census, Taiwan is the area with the largest number of people with the name. It is also the pinyin romanization of a number of less-common names including Hóng, Hóng (t , s ), and Hóng. All of those names are romanized as Hung in Wade-Giles.

"Hong" is also one spelling employed for the Cantonese pronunciation of the surname Xiong.

The Hokkien and Teochew romanization of Hong (that uses the character 洪) is Ang, which is also used for Wang (Wāng).
 
It is also the romanization used for the Korean surname Hong, which uses the character 洪 in hanja, the Khmer surname ហុង (Hong), as well as the surname Hồng in Vietnam, from the Sino-Vietnamese reading of Chinese character 洪.

Origin

The name  literally means "flood".

The legendary origin of the family links it to descendants of the Yan Emperor who originally bore the ancestral name (xing) Jiang (姜) and the clan name "Gonggong" (共共). The Gonggongs directed irrigation works and managed flood control on the west bank of the Yellow River in the southeast corner of the Ordos Loop above the Wei.

After the Yellow Emperor conquered the Yan Emperor's territory, his relatives and descendants were persecuted and the Gonggong rebelled during the reign of the Gaoyang Emperor. The future Ku Emperor led an army against the rebellion and crushed them at the Battle of Bei Zhou Shan. Supposedly, among his soldiers were the descendants of Suiren, credited with the invention of fire, so that this is referred to in Chinese sources as a battle between fire and water. The Gonggong were reinstated in their former position only to provoke widespread flooding under the Yao Emperor when they opposed some of his orders. A second army brought a second defeat and the Yao Emperor banished the Gonggong to Jiangnan.

When the Chinese ceased to have both ancestral and clan names, many Gonggongs combined the water radical from jiang with the character gong to produce Hong.

Ancestral centers
Dunhuang in Gansu and Nanchang in Jiangxi.

List of persons with the surname

Hong
Hong Chengchou (1593–1665), Chinese official under the Ming and Qing dynasties
Hong Liangji (1746–1809), Chinese scholar, statesman, political theorist, and philosopher
Hong Xiuquan (born Hong Houxiu; 1814–1862), a leader of the Taiping Rebellion
Hong Rengan (1822–1864), a leader of the Taiping Rebellion
Hong Yuanshuo (1948–2015), Chinese football manager and football player
Jian Fang Lay (Hóng Jiànfāng 洪劍芳; born 1973), right-handed Australian ladies table tennis player
Apple Hong (Hóng Yǐxīn 洪乙心; born 1978), Singaporean-Malaysian actress and singer
Hong Peiyun (born 2001), Chinese idol singer and member of Chinese idol group SNH48

Hung
Hung Shing, Tang Dynasty official and was honoured as Deity in Guangdong province and Hong Kong
Hung Hei-gun (1745–1825), Chinese martial artist of the Southern Shaolin school
William Hung (sinologist) (1893–1980), Chinese sinologist
Hung Tung (born 1920), Taiwanese painter
Hung I-Hsiang (1925–1993), Taiwanese martial artist
John Hung (born 1938), Hong Kong businessman
Hung Meng-chi (born 1947), Taiwanese politician, Minister of Culture (2014–2016)
Hung Hsiu-chu (born 1948), Taiwanese Kuomintang politician
Mien-Chie Hung (born 1950), Taiwanese-born American molecular biologist and cancer researcher
Hung Chi-chang (born 1951), Taiwanese politician, Chairman of the Straits Exchange Foundation (2007–2008)
Sammo Hung (born 1952), Hong Kong actor and martial artist
 Hong Hong, an actress from Hong Kong from 1950s to 1960s. Hong Hong has now retired from the film industry entirely. 
Stephen Hung (born 1959), Hong Kong property investor
Hung Huang (born 1961), Chinese television host 
Chris Hung (born 1963), Taiwanese enka and Hokkien pop singer
Hung Chung Yam (born 1967), Hong Kong former cyclist
 Hong Chong fen, a male lecturer from Hong Kong education university
Hung Cee Kay (born 1972), Hong Kong swimmer
Timmy Hung (born 1974), Hong Kong actor, son of Sammo Hung
Kenneth Tin-Kin Hung (born 1976), Hong Kong-born American new media artist
Kit Hung (born 1977), Hong Kong filmmaker
Osman Hung (born 1979), Hong Kong actor
Amy Hung (born 1980), Taiwanese golfer
Shih-Ting Hung (born 1980), Taiwanese film director
Hung Tzu-yung (born 1982), Taiwanese New Power Party politician
Tony Hung (born 1983), Hong Kong TVB actor and host
Emily Hung (born 1987), Taiwanese actress
Ken Hung (born 1987), Hong Kong Cantopop singer
Bruce Hung (born 1990), Taiwanese actor
Hung Jui-chen (born 1990), Taiwanese tennis player
Hung Shih-han (born 1990), Taiwanese badminton player

Ang
Ang Hin Kee, Former Member of Parliament, Singapore
Ang Kiukok, Filipino painter and national artist for Visual Arts.
Ang Mong Seng, Former Member of Parliament, Singapore 
Ang Wei Neng, Former Member of Parliament, Singapore
Ang Saw Ean Belinda, Judge of the Supreme Court, Singapore
Ang Ser Kian Joshua, former Singaporean actor
Ang Ling Somaline, Singaporean actress
Eric Ang
 Ang Jun Heng (洪隽衡 hóng jùn héng), Singaporean robbery victim
 Sunny Ang, Singaporean murderer

References

Chinese-language surnames
Taiwanese culture
Multiple Chinese surnames